Paul Yego (born 25 November 1968) is a Kenyan retired distance and marathon runner. He participated at the World Athletics Half Marathon Championships in 1995 and won a silver medal finishing behind Moses Tanui. He finished fifth in the 1995 Boston Marathon, eighth in the 1996 Boston Marathon, and seventh in the 1996 Berlin Marathon.

External links
 

1968 births
Living people
Kenyan male long-distance runners
Kenyan male marathon runners
Place of birth missing (living people)
20th-century Kenyan people